Óscar Arce may refer to:

 Óscar Martín Arce Paniagua (born 1967), Mexican politician
 Óscar Arce (Colombian footballer) (born 1990), Colombian football defender
 Óscar Arce (Mexican footballer) (born 1995), Mexican football midfielder